Brian Baker and Ryan Harrison were the defending champions but chose not to defend their title.

Peter Polansky and Neal Skupski won the title after defeating Luke Bambridge and Mitchell Krueger 4–6, 6–3, [10–1] in the final.

Seeds

Draw

References
 Main Draw

Savannah Challenger - Doubles
2017 Doubles